is a Japanese slice of life comedy seinen manga series written and illustrated by Mikio Igarashi. It was published by Shogakukan, with four volumes released. A live action film adaptation titled , directed by Suzuki Matsuo, was released on April 4, 2015.

Plot
Based on a manga series, the film stars Matsuda Ryuhei and concerns a man who develops a deep fear of money who moves to a small and remote village to deal with his phobia. The story takes place in Tōhoku region.

Former bank clerk Takeharu thought he was strange when he moved to a remote village in Japan's northeastern Tohoku region after developing an inexplicable “money allergy.” However, as he attempts to live a peaceful rural life without currency, Kamuroba village's bizarre characters draw him out of his shell in this increasingly surreal madcap comedy.

However, when a nearby town leader attempts to overthrow the handyman bus driver mayor, Takeharu must prove his attachment to Kamuroba and its people.

Cast
Ryuhei Matsuda as Takeharu Takami
Takako Matsu
Sadao Abe
Fumi Nikaidō
Toshiyuki Nishida

Volumes
1 (December 10, 2007)
2 (April 10, 2008)
3 (October 10, 2008)
4 (December 26, 2008)

Reception
The film earned  on its opening weekend in Japan.

References

External links
Film official website 

2007 manga
Comedy anime and manga
Live-action films based on manga
Films directed by Suzuki Matsuo
Manga adapted into films
Seinen manga
Shogakukan manga
Slice of life anime and manga
Tōhoku region
2010s Japanese films